Maria Guerassimenko (born 20 March 1981) is a former competitive pair skater. Representing Slovakia with Vladimir Futáš, she competed in the final segment at three ISU Championships.

Career 
Guerassimenko began learning to skate in 1987. She teamed up with Vladimir Futáš in 2001. In their first season together, they took silver at the Slovak Championships and placed 14th at the 2002 European Championships in Lausanne, Switzerland.

In their second season, Guerassimenko/Futáš took gold at the 2002 Ondrej Nepela Memorial and silver at the 2002 Golden Spin of Zagreb. They placed 11th at the 2003 European Championships in Malmö, Sweden, and 18th at the 2003 World Championships in Washington, D.C., United States. Vladimir Dvojnikov coached the pair in Bratislava.

Programs
(with Futáš)

Competitive highlights
(with Futáš)

References

External links 
 

Slovak female pair skaters
Living people
1981 births
Sportspeople from Novosibirsk